The 92nd District of the Iowa House of Representatives in the state of Iowa.

Current elected officials
Ross Paustian is the representative currently representing the district.

Past representatives
The district has previously been represented by:
 William R. Monroe, 1971–1973
 James Middleswart, 1973–1979
 Douglas Shull, 1979–1983
 Horace Daggett, 1983–1993
 Keith Kreiman, 1993–2003
 Philip Wise, 2003–2009
 Jerry Kearns, 2009–2013
 Frank Wood, 2013–2015
 Ross Paustian, 2015–present

References

092